Anything Goes is a 2009 album by Herb Alpert. It was Alpert's first album with his wife, singer Lani Hall. The album was recorded live in 2008.

References 

2009 live albums
Herb Alpert albums
Lani Hall albums